Djamila Boupacha (born 9 February 1938 in Bologhine, a suburb of Algiers) is a former militant from the Algerian National Liberation Front. She was arrested in 1960 for attempting to bomb a cafe in Algiers. Her confession, which was obtained by means of torture and rape, and her subsequent trial affected French public opinion about the methods used by the French army in Algeria after publicity by Simone de Beauvoir and Gisèle Halimi.  Boupacha was sentenced to death on June 29, 1961, but was given amnesty under the Evian Accords and later freed on 21 April 1962.

Early life 
Djamila Boupacha was born on February 9, 1938, in Saint-Eugène (today Bologhine) to an uneducated but French-speaking father (Abdelaziz Boupacha) and a mother (Zoubida Amarouche) who did not speak French. She joined Democratic Union of the Algerian Manifesto (UDMA) of Ferhat Abbas in 1953, at the age of 15, and later the National Liberation Front (FLN) in 1951. During the Algerian war, she used the nom de guerre Khelida.

FLN work, arrest, and torture 
Early in the Algerian War, Boupacha worked as a trainee at Béni Messous Hospital but was prevented from taking a certificate in training because of her race and religion. This setback played a role in Boupacha's initial rejection of the French colonial system in Algeria.

On 10 February 1960, French troops raided Boupacha's household and arrested her, her father and her brother-in-law. She was accused of having planted a bomb - defused by army deminers - at the Brasserie des faculties on September 27, 1959, in Algiers.

The arrestees were taken to a military barracks at El Biar where they were beaten and interrogated. Boupacha was later transferred and tortured at the prison of Hussein Dey. The torture included brutal sexual violence, including the burning of her breasts and legs with cigarettes as well as vaginal rape with an empty beer bottle, as reported by Simone de Beauvoir. Under torture, Boupacha confessed to planting a bomb at a University restaurant on 27 September 1959.

Torture was a common experience for women who were arrested in this conflict, and rape was systematically used to terrorize and shame the Algerian community. The importance of Boupacha's case lies in her decision to bring a suit against her torturers. Though she did not deny her affiliation with the FLN and her commitment to Algerian independence, she did argue that a confession achieved under torture should not be admissible before the military tribunal that was to try her.

Trial and book publication

Publication and political implications 
Working with French Tunisian lawyer Gisèle Halimi, Boupacha brought her torture case to trial, causing a scandal in France and Algeria and gaining wide public attention. Halimi and Simone de Beauvoir wrote a book entitled Djamila Boupacha, with the subtitle The Story of the Torture of a Young Algerian Girl which Shocked Liberal French Opinion as part of a broader plan to “rally public opinion and to put the government on trial for violating Article 344 of the French Penal Code.” Throughout the trial, Boupacha also gained the support of prominent artists and intellectuals such as Henri Alleg, André Philip, and Pablo Picasso. Publicizing the French use of torture was particularly damning given that “France had signed three international documents condemning torture” and, consequently, “De Gaulle repeatedly denied that torture was still used in Algeria.” Julien S. Murphy writes that the book, along with a 1960 article by Beauvoir in Le Monde, sought to spread the knowledge of the French government’s unlawful torture during the Algerian War. Boupacha's violated virginity and her physical and metaphorical purity came under intense scrutiny in the court case as well as in the media.  The army's practices of sexual humiliation were already known to the public, but Boupacha's case shed light on how far the army would go to protect her torturers from prosecution. Despite being asked by Le Monde to remove the statement that Boupacha had been a virgin prior to her capture, Beauvoir kept it in her article, causing Judith Surkish to explain that although “Beauvoir denounced the fetishization of virginity as the product of paternalistic ethics, here she nonetheless mobilised that figure for the sake of political argument.” Consequently, Natalya Vince claims that Boupacha and other female FLN fighters had their “bodies and sexualities…on display for public consumption.”  Murphy further explains that “in her memoir, Beauvoir minimized the political content and impact” of her 1960 writing, portraying it as simply Djamila’s story, whereas it “was actually a scathing indictment of the Army."

In addition to the facts of the case, Beauvoir interrogated the notion of “French Algeria,”—asking what the phrase would mean if the laws of France were set aside by the army” The article also questioned government control of the army, saying “Such an abdication of responsibility would be a betrayal of France as a whole, of you, of me, of each and every one of us.” Beauvoir further implicated all citizens in the torture of Algerians such as Boupacha, writing that “every citizen thereby becomes a member of a collectively criminal nation.” Boupacha thus became a figure at the center of “political engagement” and “public opinion.” French officials in Algeria also hindered Boupacha's access to legal representation, denying Halimi's visas to Algeria for Boupacha's court dates. Through the book, Boupacha and her supporters  attempted to publicize these actions and garner support to delay the trial in order to allow her more time for preparation and visas. In an act of retaliation and silencing, the government “seized and destroyed” copies of the issue of Le Monde containing Beauvoir’s article in Algiers. The book itself, published in 1962, not only describes Boupacha’s story yet also serves as a “historical record” and Beauvoir’s “most explicit act of support for decolonization of Algeria.” The book insisted “that revulsion at Boupacha’s torture must lead to political action.” More generally speaking, scholars like Maria Vendetti argue that the text Djamila Boupacha “brings the act of torture into public discourse…despite the strong preference for denial and inattention.” However, the Evian Accords ended the War for Independence, freed Boupacha, and provided the Army with immunity. Thus, despite all the efforts of Boupacha, Halimi, and Beauvoir, the Evian Accords meant that her torturers ultimately could not be prosecuted.

Boupacha Committee 
The Djamila Boupacha Committee was a continuation of Beauvoir and Halimi’s efforts and instrumental in drumming up public outrage. The Committee campaigned to remove the case from Algerian jurisdiction; this campaign was successful, and the case was transferred to France in December 1960. More generally, the Committee worked to free Boupacha and pressure “the government to publicly punish Boupacha’s torturers, an ambitious goal since corruption and abuse regarding the practices of torturing prisoners by the French was abetted at the highest levels.”

Contents of book 
Djamila Boupacha includes an introduction by Beauvoir followed by a section by Halimi focusing on Boupacha’s biography and the legal case, and finally statements by “engaged intellectuals” such as Henri Alleg, Jules Roy, and Françoise Sagan.  In 1958 Henri Alleg authored a text entitled La Question, thereby connecting Boupacha to the other, male torture victims in Algeria and corroborating and legitimizing her statement further. Following Alleg’s and others’ reactions, the book contains Boupacha’s own testimony, the 1960 Le Monde article, Boupacha’s father’s statement, and several family photographs.

Boupacha’s reaction 
Boupacha originally said that she had “never been able to read” the book titled with her own name. However, in a 2005 interview she explained that she decided to read it before an interview about fifteen years previously in order to remind herself of the dates of various events so she “‘wouldn’t say anything silly.’ Yet in doing so, she ‘felt like I was being strangled.’”

Later life and legacy

Post-war activities 
After the Evian Accords, the end of the War, and the resulting Algerian independence from France, Boupacha worked in the Office for Women’s Employment. In discussing her work during this period, she mentions that she tried to lead illiterate women into trade jobs such as becoming a seamstress rather than returning to an “old colonial role for ‘indigenous women’” of being domestic cleaners. As for more educated women, she explains that she helped them “into accounting, into secretarial roles.”

Political involvement, status as national symbol  
In post-independence Algeria, Boupacha remained important as an icon. The FLN used Boupacha as a symbol to support their claim to legitimacy as a one-party state.  Boupacha thus became an “official envoy” for the post-independence Algerian government, acting alongside other women in the FLN as “living symbols of the fusion between forward-looking youthful courageousness and historical integrity, the harmonious coming together of pan-Arabism and socialism.” For example, in March 1963, Boupacha was one of only four individuals in the “first official delegation to Britain since Algerian independence, the guests of Queen Elizabeth.”  At the time, Alger républicain wrote that Boupacha was “particularly interested in women’s organisations, whilst the men participating in this delegation have expressed a particular interest in visiting the different industrial sectors in Britain.” However, in 2005 Boupacha told an interviewer that she was selected for this delegation only because “they needed a woman,” more to improve Algeria’s public image and “fulfill a gendered role” than to engage in serious politics. She participated, though, because “she felt that she had a responsibility to serve,” the same reason why she acquiesced more generally to being a “symbol of Algeria as part of her contribution to the nationalist struggle,” despite her discomfort with this fame, preferring anonymity. Boupacha also cited the countless other women who worked towards independence but were not recognized for their efforts, saying “there are many other women who suffered more than we did and we don’t know them.” Boupacha served more as a symbol than a real person for Simone de Beauvoir as well, at least according to Halimi, who “complained that Beauvoir was more concerned about the cause than she was about Boupacha herself.”

In Algiers in 1963, Boupacha visited the new Fatma N’Soumer Centre for Daughters of Shuhada with Nasser, contributing to an image that positioned the women who fought with the FLN guerillas during the war as “direct descendants of the anti-colonial struggle which had begun in the nineteenth century” and portraying “the young girls in the orphanage as representing the future of the struggle for freedom, equality and pan-Arab unity.” Historian Natalya Vince describes this as “a neat narrative of who we are, where we come from and where we are going.” Boupacha also frequently speaks to schoolchildren, generally preferring to emphasize “civic responsibility.”

The Museum of the Army in Algiers contains official commemorative oil paintings of Boupacha and other female FLN members, painted from photographs approximately from the war period.  
In the 2000s, Boupacha also inspired a song called "Djamila" that was composed by Bernard Joyet and sung by Francesca Solleville. Her legacy also lives on in popular culture through Picasso's artwork inspired by her. Composer Luigi Nono wrote "Djamila Boupachà" in 1962, part of his Canti di vita e d'amore.

References

Further reading
Simone de Beauvoir and Gisèle Halimi, Djamila Boupacha : the story of the torture of a young Algerian girl which shocked liberal French opinion (London: André Deutsch, Weidenfeld, and Nicolson, 1962). 
 Zahia Smail Salhi, "Boubacha, Djamila," in Dictionary of African Biography, vol. 1 (Oxford: Oxford University Press, 2012), 498-500.
 Rita Maran, Torture, The Role of Ideology in the French-Algerian War (New York: Praeger Publishers, 1989).
 Philip Agee, "Torture as an Instrument of National Policy: France 1954—1962," Social Justice 17 no. 4 (1990): 131-138
 Page Whaley Eager, "The 'Wretched of the Earth' Rebel: Women and Wars of National Liberation," in From Freedom Fighters to Terrorists: Women and Political Violence (Burlington VT: Ashgate, 2008). 
 Pour Djamila (2011), film dir. Caroline Huppert with Marina Hands and Hafsia Herzi. 
 Ce soir (ou jamais !), France 3, 20/03/2012, with Gisèle Halimi, Marina Hands, Hafsia Herzi and Sylvie Thénault, 
Vince, Natalya. Our Fighting Sisters : Nation, Memory and Gender in Algeria, 1954-2012. Manchester University Press, 2015.

People of the Algerian War
People imprisoned on charges of terrorism
Torture victims
1938 births
Living people
African women in war
Women in 20th-century warfare
People from Bologhine
Violence against women in Algeria